Randolph is a city in Clay County, Missouri, United States. The population was 57 at the 2020 census. It is completely surrounded by Kansas City and is a part of the Kansas City metropolitan area.

History
An early variant name was "East Kansas City". The name of the post office changed from East Kansas City to Randolph in 1920, and the post office closed in 1928.

Geography
Randolph is located at  (39.158653, -94.494410).

Randolph is on the banks of the Missouri River. It is surrounded by Kansas City on all land borders, and the opposite side of the Missouri is also Kansas City.

Demographics

2010 census
As of the census of 2010, there were 52 people, 24 households, and 14 families living in the city. The racial makeup of the city was 98.1% White and 1.9% Asian. Hispanic or Latino of any race were 1.9% of the population.

There were 24 households, of which 20.8% had children under the age of 18 living with them, 41.7% were married couples living together, 12.5% had a female householder with no husband present, 4.2% had a male householder with no wife present, and 41.7% were non-families. 33.3% of all households were made up of individuals, and 8.4% had someone living alone who was 65 years of age or older. The average household size was 2.17 and the average family size was 2.71.

The median age in the city was 47.5 years. 17.3% of residents were under the age of 18; 7.7% were between the ages of 18 and 24; 19.2% were from 25 to 44; 34.5% were from 45 to 64; and 21.2% were 65 years of age or older. The gender makeup of the city was 59.6% male and 40.4% female.

2000 census
As of the census of 2000, there were 47 people, 20 households, and 14 families living in the city. The population density was 137.7 people per square mile (53.4/km). There were 22 housing units at an average density of 64.5 per square mile (25.0/km). The racial makeup of the city was 95.74% White, and 4.26% from two or more races.

There were 20 households, out of which 15.0% had children under the age of 18 living with them, 55.0% were married couples living together, 15.0% had a female householder with no husband present, and 30.0% were non-families. 20.0% of all households were made up of individuals, and 5.0% had someone living alone who was 65 years of age or older. The average household size was 2.35 and the average family size was 2.64.

In the city the population was spread out, with 14.9% under the age of 18, 6.4% from 18 to 24, 38.3% from 25 to 44, 21.3% from 45 to 64, and 19.1% who were 65 years of age or older. The median age was 39 years. For every 100 females, there were 123.8 males. For every 100 females age 18 and over, there were 110.5 males.

The median income for a household in the city was $53,750, and the median income for a family was $53,750. Males had a median income of $31,667 versus $35,000 for females. The per capita income for the city was $23,067. None of the population and none of the families were below the poverty line.

Education
Residents are zoned to North Kansas City School District. Randolph is zoned to Topping Elementary School, Maple Park Middle School, and Winnetonka High School.

Audit
In 2010, Randolph was cited by Missouri State Auditor Susan Montee for violating the state's speed trap law, by funding over 73% of the city budget from traffic violations.

References

Cities in Clay County, Missouri
Missouri populated places on the Missouri River
Cities in Missouri